"If You Don't Give a Doggone about it" (spelled "Dogone" in its original release) is a song written and performed by James Brown. Issued as the B-side of Brown's 1977 single "People Who Criticize", it charted #45 R&B. It also appeared on the album Mutha's Nature.

References

James Brown songs
Songs written by James Brown
1977 singles
1977 songs
Polydor Records singles